The Clinic is a partly satirical Chilean newspaper that offers analysis and opinion on politics, culture, and current affairs. The newspaper was founded by Patricio Fernández Chadwick in November 1998. The paper includes a wide mix of cultural criticism, jokes, in-depth interviews, and investigative work. The name was inspired by Chilean dictator Augusto Pinochet's October 1998 arrest in Britain at The London Clinic, which bears the name The Clinic on its façade. In its first incarnation, it was only a few pages long, distributed only within Santiago, and costing 100 pesos (US$0.22 at the time). Over the years, it has changed drastically, and in 2013 cost 1000 pesos (US$1.75 in 2013) and averages forty pages. Today, it is published every Thursday during normal operation times (it usually takes February off). It published its 499th edition on June 20, 2013 and 900th edition by October 6, 2022.

Humor

One of its humor features is done in a style reminiscent of Sergio Aragones' marginal cartoons in Mad Magazine: at the bottom of each page (except the covers), the statement Sabía usted que...( Did you know that...?) is printed and followed by a remark which can be obscene, witty, snarky, or impenetrable, but is always very short. Another hallmark of The Clinic is its "shocking" covers, which often contain near-nudity and photoshopped heads, along with ironic or double entendre captions.

Examples:
It's true: marijuana leads to coke, fries, two burgers, three ice creams...
Ghosts don't believe in people.
If everybody who says they were there, really was there, the GAP (Armed Personal Guard, an organization established to serve as a paramilitary presidential bodyguard for Salvador Allende) had about 70,000 members.
To be on the front page of Las Últimas Noticias, all you have to do is bare your butt in a disco.
Barney is Godzilla's gay son.
For the cost of a missile, you can make 25,000 envelopes with anthrax.

Editorial stance

The Clinic covers current events from a generally leftist position, showing contempt for almost all other media outlets in the country, and mocking politicians of all stripes, from former military dictator Augusto Pinochet to the late communist leader Gladys Marín.

The Clinic is also critical of what it calls "lazy reporting" and many times it has criticized the centrist and center-left governments that have ruled Chile after its transition to democratic government.

See also
 List of satirical magazines

External links
The Clinic Web site (in Spanish)

References 

Spanish-language newspapers
Newspapers published in Chile
Biweekly newspapers
Satirical newspapers
Mass media in Santiago
Newspapers established in 1998
1998 establishments in Chile